The 59046 Valsad - Bandra Terminus Passenger is a passenger train of the Indian Railways connecting  in Gujarat and  of Maharashtra. It is currently being operated with 59046 train number on a daily basis.

Service

The 59046/Valsad - Bandra Terminus Passenger has average speed of 39 km/hr and covers 183 km in 4 hrs 40 mins.

Route 

Coach composite

The train consists of 18 coaches:

 16 General Unreserved(GEN)
 2 Seating cum Luggage Rake(SLR)

Traction

Train is hauled by a Locomotive shed, Vadodara  based WAP-4 or Locomotive shed, Valsad based WAG-5B.

Rake Sharing

The train shares its rake with 59037/59038 Virar - Surat Passenger, 59039 Virar - Valsad Shuttle, 59040 Vapi - Virar Shuttle, 59045 Bandra Terminus - Vapi Passenger.

External links 

 59046/Valsad - Bandra Terminus Passenger

References 

Transport in Valsad
Rail transport in Gujarat
Rail transport in Maharashtra
Slow and fast passenger trains in India